The Thailand Center of Excellence for Life Sciences (TCELS) was founded in 2004 by the government of Thailand. TCELS is a public organization under the auspices of the Ministry of Higher Education, Science, Research and Innovation. TCELS has the responsibility of providing a link between innovation in life sciences and investment, and spurring domestic and international partnership in the life science business in Thailand.

History
TCELS was founded in 2004. Initially, TCELS was established as an organization under the umbrella of the Office of Knowledge Management and Development (OKMD), which houses a group of public organizations under the supervision of the Office of the Prime Minister. On 27 May 2011, TCELS was elevated to a public organization under the Ministry of Science and Technology (MST).

Mission
Support and develop the life sciences business and industry
Promote and support innovations, research, and knowledge related to the commercialization of life sciences products and services
Develop and support the necessary infrastructure and human capacity for life sciences business and industry
Create a strategic plan for developing life sciences business and industry
Serve as the coordination center for facilitating cooperation among domestic and international organizations for life sciences business and industry
Serve as Thailand’s life sciences business information and knowledge center.

Focus areas

Pharmaceuticals and biotechnology
A key project is pharmacogenomics. TCELS supports the Medical Genomic Center to promote awareness of this diagnostic tool.

Natural products
TCELS has supported a project with the aim of developing new products from Hb extract, Hevea brasiliensis. The research is conducted by a team from Prince of Songkhla University.

Biomedical engineering
TCELS conducts various projects in medical robotics, medical devices, and operates the Advanced Dental Technology Center (ADTEC).

Medical services
Advanced Cell and Gene Therapies Program
Automated Cell and Tissue Production Plant

References

External links
 TCELS

Public organizations of Thailand
Medical and health organizations based in Thailand